Tecmo World Cup '90 is an association football video game released by Tecmo for arcades in 1989. It was an arcade successor to Tecmo's Tehkan World Cup (1985), and is based on the 1990 FIFA World Cup.

An unofficial bootleg of the game named Euro League featuring European club teams was also released. An unfaithful home version was developed by SIMS for the Sega Mega Drive renamed simply Tecmo World Cup (in Japan, the game was called Tecmo World Cup '92), and ported to the Sega Master System as Tecmo World Cup '93.

Gameplay
The player can select one from eight available national teams in Tecmo World Cup '90. Japan were included despite them failing to qualify for the World Cup in 1990. The game was an unofficial release, giving them the chance to include the team to appease Japanese players.

The following teams are selectable.

 
 
 
 
 
 
 
 

The Genesis version and Master System versions feature 24 national teams:

 
 
 
 
 
 

 
 
 
 
 
 

 
 
 
 
 
 

 
 
  ( in the American version and on Master System version)
 
 
 

Euro League features 8 club teams:
  FC Barcelona
  Atlético Madrid
  Real Madrid C.F.
  A.C. Milan
  PSV Eindhoven
  Inter Milan
  S.S.C. Napoli
  FC Bayern Munich
Note that in this bootleg the official club names and logos are not used.

Reception 
In Japan, Game Machine listed Tecmo World Cup '90 on their November 1, 1989 issue as being the second most-successful table arcade unit of the month. In the United Kingdom, it was one of the top four highest-grossing arcade games during early 1990, along with Teenage Mutant Ninja Turtles, Super Masters and Line of Fire.

World Cup '90 received positive reviews from critics upon release in arcades. Sean Kelly of Zero magazine called it a "fast and addictive" game. Computer + Video Games magazine gave it an 83% score, stating "Tecmo's latest is a really neat football game which combines excellent graphics and great gameplay to produce one of the best arcade football games yet seen."

See also
 Super Sidekicks
 Tecmo World Cup Soccer
 International Superstar Soccer
 Neo Geo Cup '98: The Road to the Victory
 Legendary Eleven

References

External links
 at classicgaming.com
http://www.arcade-history.com/?n=tecmo-world-cup-'90&page=detail&id=2847 at arcade history

1989 video games
Arcade video games
Association football video games
Sega Genesis games
Tecmo games
Multiplayer and single-player video games
Video games developed in Japan